Poison - Double Dose: Ultimate Hits is a double disc greatest hits compilation album released May 3, 2011 by the hard rock band Poison to celebrate the band's 25th anniversary. The career-spanning collection features thirty-five of the multi-platinum band's top hits and fan favorites. The album charted at #23 on the Billboard Top Hard Rock Albums chart and #17 in Canada.

Release and promotion
Poison also announced a 2011 summer tour with fellow rockers Mötley Crüe and the New York Dolls to celebrate the band's 25th anniversary and also Mötley Crüe's 30th anniversary.

The compilation features tracks from the following albums: Look What the Cat Dragged In, Open Up and Say... Ahh!, Flesh & Blood, Swallow This Live, Native Tongue, Poison's Greatest Hits: 1986–1996, Crack a Smile... and More!, The Best of Poison: 20 Years of Rock and Poison'd. Only the albums Power to the People and Hollyweird are not represented.

The compilation includes all of Poison's hit singles that charted on the Billboard Hot 100 and Mainstream rock charts.

Track listing

Personnel
 Bret Michaels - lead vocals
 Bobby Dall - bass guitar
 Rikki Rockett - drums
 C.C. DeVille - lead guitar
 Blues Saraceno - lead guitar
 Richie Kotzen - lead guitar

Charts

References

External links

Poison (American band) compilation albums
2011 greatest hits albums